Elihu Stout (1786–1860) was the founder of Indiana's first newspaper, the Indiana Gazette.

Legacy 
In 1966, Elihu Stout was inducted into the Indiana Journalism Hall of Fame.

References 

American newspaper founders
1786 births
1860 deaths
19th-century American businesspeople
Journalists from Indiana